Ville Lång (born 14 February 1985) is a badminton player from Finland. He won ten consecutive Finland's National Championship men's singles title in 2005–2014, and 3 men's doubles title in 2010, 2011, and 2017. In 2003, he won bronze at the European Junior Championships. Lång competed at the 2008 and 2012 Summer Olympics. He announced his retirement on 31 January 2016, and received a meritorious service award from BWF. After retired from the international competition, Lång started his coaching career first in Paris where he coached the league team Aulnay-sous-Bois after which he has been the head coach of one local club in Sweden. In 2019, he was elected as vice chairman of BWF Athletes' Commission to represent the needs and views of athletes to the BWF council and committees.

Achievements

European Junior Championships 
Boys' singles

BWF Grand Prix (1 title) 
The BWF Grand Prix had two levels, the BWF Grand Prix and Grand Prix Gold. It was a series of badminton tournaments sanctioned by the Badminton World Federation (BWF) which was held from 2007 to 2017.

Men's singles

  BWF Grand Prix Gold tournament
  BWF Grand Prix tournament

BWF International Challenge/Series (14 titles, 11 runner-ups) 
Men's singles

  BWF International Challenge tournament
  BWF International Series tournament
  BWF Future Series tournament

References

External links 
 European results
 

1985 births
Living people
Sportspeople from Lahti
Finnish male badminton players
Badminton players at the 2008 Summer Olympics
Badminton players at the 2012 Summer Olympics
Olympic badminton players of Finland
Badminton coaches
20th-century Finnish people
21st-century Finnish people